Digheli is a census village in Nalbari district, Assam, India. As per the 2011 Census of India, Digheli has a total population of 5,285 people including 2,696 males and 2,589 females, and with a literacy rate of 91.17%.

Digheli has a history of militancy affected and flood affected area.

References 

Villages in Nalbari district